The A587 is a road in England that runs from Blackpool to Fleetwood in Lancashire.

It begins close to the Oxford junction in Marton, in the south-eastern part of Blackpool  as a turning off the A583, Preston New Road. After the Plymouth Road roundabout, it crosses the railway close to Layton station, and continues north as Bispham Road for a further , passing through the Warbreck area before reaching Bispham roundabout. 

From Bispham it then continues north, as Devonshire Road and later Fleetwood Road, for a further  through the north Blackpool suburbs of Norbreck and Little Bispham before it is joined at Anchorsholme by the A584 Queen's Promenade. Past Cleveleys, as a single lane road, now known as Rossall Road, it continues north for a further , past Rossall School in a short 40mph section, and into Fleetwood, where it becomes Broadway. The road crosses West View roundabout, and turns right down Poulton Road, eventually terminating at the new Ash Street roundabout, near Fleetwood Freeport  where it joins to the A585. 

Roads in England
Roads in Lancashire
A587 road